Opogona stathmota is a moth of the family Tineidae first described by Edward Meyrick in 1911. It is found in Sri Lanka.

References

Moths of Asia
Moths described in 1911
Tineidae
Hieroxestinae